Bhavana Balakrishnan also spelt as Bhavna Balakrishnan also simply known as VJ Bhavana (born 22 May 1982) is an Indian television anchor, cricket commentator, video jockey, playback singer and dancer. She is one of the most popular sports journalists in India after Mayanti Langer. She currently works as a broadcaster for Star Sports and has hosted several programmes for the channel. Balakrishnan was one of the women to commentate during the 2019 Cricket World Cup.

Career 
Balakrishnan began her career as a radio jockey for a brief period and ventured into television. She joined Raj TV as a host, and the first television show she hosted was Beach Girls Show. She later joined Star Vijay channel and became a full-time anchor with the channel in 2011. Her first programme with Vijay TV was Super Singer Junior, and she also hosted Airtel Super Singer until 2018. She has hosted other shows with the channel including the "Fun Unlimited" season of Jodi Number One.

In 2017, she joined Star Sports as a sports journalist and hosted broadcasts of for the Indian Premier League (IPL) and Pro Kabaddi League. She served as a commentator for Star Sports Tamil during the 2018 IPL season and was one of just two female presenters during the 2018 Indian Premier League.

Balakrishnan made her debut as singer in 2018 and released her first single The MashUp Series by BB.
In 2020, she sang her first playback song for music director Dharan. The song "Veerathi Veera" has more than half a million views on YouTube.

Personal life 
She married Mumbai based businessman Nikhil Ramesh and currently resides in Mumbai.

References 

1986 births
Living people
Indian female dancers
Indian women singers
Indian women television presenters
Indian sports journalists
Indian sports broadcasters
Indian women television journalists
Indian television journalists
People from Chennai
21st-century Indian women
21st-century Indian people